In chemistry, oxychlorination is a process for generating the equivalent of chlorine gas (Cl2) from hydrogen chloride and oxygen.  This process is attractive industrially because hydrogen chloride is less expensive than chlorine.

Mechanism
The reaction is usually initiated by copper(II) chloride (CuCl2), which is the most common catalyst in the production of 1,2-dichloroethane. In some cases, CuCl2 is supported on silica in presence of KCl, LaCl3, or AlCl3 as cocatalysts. Aside from silica, a variety of supports have also been used including various types of alumina, diatomaceous earth, or pumice. Because this reaction is highly exothermic (238 kJ/mol), the temperature is monitored, to guard against thermal degradation of the catalyst.  The reaction is as follows:
CH2=CH2  +  2 CuCl2   →   2 CuCl  +  ClH2C-CH2Cl

The copper(II) chloride is regenerated by sequential reactions of the cuprous chloride with oxygen and then hydrogen chloride:
½ O2  +  2 CuCl  →   CuOCuCl2
2 HCl  +  CuOCuCl2    →   2 CuCl2  +  H2O

Applications
Oxychlorination is employed in the conversion of ethylene into vinyl chloride.  In the first step in this process, ethylene undergoes oxychlorination to give ethylene chloride:
CH2=CH2  +  2 HCl  +  ½ O2    →    ClCH2CH2Cl  +  H2O
Oxychlorination is of special importance in the making of 1,2-dichloroethane, which is then converted into vinyl chloride. As can be seen in the following reaction, 1,2-dichloroethane is cracked: 
ClCH2CH2Cl    →   CH2=CHCl  +  HCl

The HCl from this cracking process is recycled by oxychlorination in order to reduce the consumption of raw material HCl (or Cl2, if direct chlorination of ethylene is chosen as main way to produce 1,2-dichloroethane).

Iron(III) chloride is produced commercially by oxychlorination (and other methods).  For example, dissolution of iron ores in hydrochloric acid gives a mixture of ferrous and ferric chlorides:

The iron(II) chloride is converted to the iron(III) derivative by treatment with oxygen and hydrochloric acid:

References

Organic reactions
Inorganic reactions
Halogens